Toulon won the  1991-92 French Rugby Union Championship beating Biarritz  in the final.

It was Toulon's third Bouclier de Brennus.

Group A 
The teams are listed as the ranking, in bold the teams admitted  to "last 16" round.

"last 32" 
In bold the clubs qualified for the "last 16".

"last 16" 
In bold the clubs qualified for the quarter of finals.

Quarter of finals 
In bold the clubs qualified for the next round

Semifinals 

Toulon and Biarritz were qualified for the final.

Final

External links 
 Compte rendu finale 1992 lnr.fr
 Finale 1992 finalesrugby.com

1992
France
Championship